Aitkul B. Samakova is a Kazakhstani politician, former member of parliament, and political scientist. She has been a representative to the Mazhilis and the Senate of Kazakhstan, and the First Deputy to the Kazakhstan Minister of Trade. Samakova was Kazakhstan's Minister of the Environment from 2002 to 2006.

Early life and education
Samakova was born on 2 February 1949 in Kazakhstan.

In 1967, Samakova earned a technical degree at an Almaty polytechnic college. From 1967 until 1980, Samakova worked at a canning plant in Almaty, first as an engineer and then in management positions. In 1973 she earned another technical degree in Taraz, and then in 1983 she graduated from Kazakhstan's Higher Party School (kk) with a degree in political science, followed by a law degree from Abai Kazakh National Pedagogical University in 1999.

Political career
In 1980, Samakova became the Party Secretary for the Frunze district of the Communist Party of Kazakhstan. From 1980 to 1991 she served in that capacity, as the head of the Almaty City Party Committee, and as the deputy head of the Communist Party of Kazakhstan department of trade and consumer services.

In 1991, Samakova was appointed the First Deputy to the Kazakhstan Minister of Trade. Then, in 1996, she became the Head of the Department of Citizenship in the executive branch of the Republic of Kazakhstan.

In 1998, Samakova joined the Senate of Kazakhstan. In 1999, the President of Kazakhstan appointed her the Chairman of the National Commission for Family and Women Affairs under the President of the Republic of Kazakhstan, and she was briefly the Deputy Head of Government in that year. In this capacity, she was responsible for representing the government of Kazakhstan on issues pertaining to the treatment of women to international bodies like the United Nations.

In 2002, she was appointed Minister of the Environment. She was a member of the Tasmagambetov Cabinet and the Daniyal Akhmetov Cabinet. While Minister of the Environment, Samakova continued to be Chairman of the National Commission for Family and Women Affairs under the President of the Republic of Kazakhstan. She continued to hold this post after leaving the Environment Ministry in 2006.

In 2007 Samakova became a deputy to the Mazhilis for Nur Otan. Samakova served on the Environment and Nature Management Committees, and worked as the Chairman of the Nur Otan's Social Council. She was a representative in the Nur Otan until 2016.

Samakova is a member of the Board of Directors of the Export Insurance company KazakhExport.

References

Living people
1949 births
People from Almaty
Women political scientists
Kazakhstani political scientists
20th-century Kazakhstani politicians
21st-century Kazakhstani politicians
Communist Party of Kazakhstan politicians
Nur Otan politicians
Government ministers of Kazakhstan
Women government ministers of Kazakhstan
Members of the Senate of Kazakhstan
Members of the Mazhilis
20th-century Kazakhstani women politicians
21st-century Kazakhstani women politicians
Soviet women in politics